James Elliott Alderman served a six-year term as justice for the Florida Supreme Court from 1978 to 1985, retiring after a personal tragedy forced his return home to tend the family business. Alderman's term notably came about as one of the first appointed justices after an amendment abolished direct elections for vacancies. He died in Vero Beach on June 10, 2021.

Early life and education
A sixth-generation Floridian, Alderman attended Fort Pierce High School and grew up working on the family ranch. The Aldermans raised cattle in St. Lucie county since 1830, well before Florida achieved statehood in 1845.

Public Service
 Alderman's first foray into public service began when Governor picked Alderman to serve as a County judge for St. Lucie County 1971. Five years later, Alderman successfully ran for St. Lucie county circuit judge in 1976, and was soon appointed to the 4th District Court of Appeal in West Palm Beach by Governor later that year.

Alderman was one of the first justices appointed by Governor  under the new constitutional amendment that ended the direct election of supreme court justices to six-year terms. A later constitutional amendment modified the provisions regarding term limits so that appointees face a retention election instead, which Alderman won.

References

1936 births
2021 deaths
Fredric G. Levin College of Law alumni
Justices of the Florida Supreme Court
Florida lawyers
People from Fort Pierce, Florida